Sultan Al-Saud is a football player for Al-Hilal in the Saudi Premier League.

References

Al Hilal SFC players
Saudi Professional League players
Living people
1985 births
Saudi Arabian footballers
Association football forwards